Sonja Roman (11 March 1979 in Hodoš) is a Slovenian middle distance runner who specializes in the 1500 metres. She is the national record holder (4:02,13 in Rome 2009) in the event.

She finished seventh at the 2007 European Indoor Championships and won the bronze medal at the 2009 European Indoor Championships. She also competed at the European Championships in 2002 and 2006, the World Indoor Championships in 2003, 2004, 2006 and 2008, the European Indoor Championships in 2005, the World Championships in 2007 and the 2008 Olympic Games without reaching the final round.

She won the 1500 m title in the First Division section of the 2009 European Team Championships and also took the 3000 m silver medal. She represented Slovenia in the 1500 m at the 2009 World Championships in Athletics and reached the semi-finals. She was ninth in the event at the 2009 IAAF World Athletics Final.

Roman won the Amora Cross in Lisbon in November 2010, but said the race was not preparation for the 2010 European Cross Country Championships, but rather for the 2011 European Athletics Indoor Championships.

Competition record

Personal bests
800 metres - 2:02.47 min (2003)
1500 metres - 4:02,13 min (2009)
1500 metres - 4:06.75 min (2007, indoor)
3000 metres - 8:54.24 min (2008, indoor)

References

1979 births
Living people
Slovenian female middle-distance runners
Athletes (track and field) at the 2008 Summer Olympics
Athletes (track and field) at the 2012 Summer Olympics
Olympic athletes of Slovenia
People from Hodoš
Competitors at the 2003 Summer Universiade
Competitors at the 2005 Summer Universiade
Athletes (track and field) at the 2005 Mediterranean Games
Mediterranean Games competitors for Slovenia